Ljubomir Ljubojević (born November 2, 1950) is a Serbian chess grandmaster. He won the Yugoslav Chess Championship in 1977 (tied) and 1982.

Life and career
Ljubojević was born on 2 November 1950 in Titovo Užice, Yugoslavia (now Užice, Serbia).  He was awarded the International Master (IM) title in 1970 and the Grandmaster (GM) title in 1971. Ljubojević was Yugoslav champion in 1977 (jointly) and 1982. He won the 1974 Canadian Open Chess Championship. In 1983 he was ranked third in the Elo rating list, but he never succeeded in reaching the Candidates Tournament stage of the World Championship.

He won an individual gold medal on third board at Skopje 1972 and three bronze medals (one individual and two team).

Ljubojević tied for first place with Robert Hübner at Linares 1985. He has defeated almost every top grandmaster active during his career, including world champions Garry Kasparov, Anatoly Karpov, and Viswanathan Anand.

Tournament victories
Palma de Majorca 1971
Las Palmas 1974
Las Palmas 1975
Manila 1975
Wijk aan Zee 1976
São Paulo 1979
Buenos Aires 1979
Linares 1985
Reggio Emilia 1985–86
Belgrade 1987
Brussels 1987
Barcelona 1989
Reggio Emilia 1990–91

Notable games
Ljubomir Ljubojevic vs Ulf Andersson, Wijk aan Zee 1976, Sicilian Defense: Paulsen, Bastrikov Variation (B47), 1–0
Bent Larsen vs Ljubomir Ljubojevic, Milano 1975, Benoni Defense: Classical Variation, Czerniak Defense (A77), 0–1
Ljubomir Ljubojevic vs Viktor Korchnoi, Linares 1985, French Defense: Winawer, Poisoned Pawn Variation (C18), 1–0
Ljubomir Ljubojevic vs Anthony Miles, Bugojno 1986, English Opening: General (A10), 1–0

References

External links

 (1,945 games)

1950 births
Chess grandmasters
Living people
Serbian chess players
Yugoslav chess players
Chess Olympiad competitors
Sportspeople from Užice